The Bonnyville Pontiacs are a Junior A ice hockey team in the Alberta Junior Hockey League. They play in Bonnyville, Alberta, Canada at the R. J. Lalonde Arena.

History

The Bonnyville Pontiacs entered the Alberta Junior Hockey League (AJHL) as the league's ninth team for the 1991–92 season, adopting the Pontiacs name and logo originally used by the Senior A team of the same name in the 1950s.

The franchise was awarded, along with the 1991–92 all-star game, on June 1, 1991, leaving just two months for the new organization to find staff and players before the start of the season. The short off-season hampered the team on the ice, as it finished a distant last place in the standings and missing the playoffs. The Pontiacs remained in last for two more seasons before qualifying for the postseason for the first time in 1995. The team continued to finish in the bottom half of the standings for most of the next two decades.

Season-by-season record

Note: GP = Games played, W = Wins, L = Losses, T/OTL = Ties/Overtime losses, SOL = Shootout losses, Pts = Points, GF = Goals for, GA = Goals against

NHL alumni
The following former Pontiacs have gone on to play in the NHL:

Matt Climie
Justin Fontaine
Jon Kalinski
Mark Letestu
Brinson Pasichnuk
Nolan Pratt
Grant Stevenson
Harry York

The following former Pontiacs have gone on to play for the Canada national women's ice hockey team:

Shannon Szabados

See also
 List of ice hockey teams in Alberta

External links
Bonnyville Pontiacs website
Alberta Junior Hockey League website

Alberta Junior Hockey League teams
Ice hockey teams in Alberta
Ice hockey clubs established in 1991
1991 establishments in Alberta